Papa Djibril Guèye (Arabic: بابا جبريل) (born 7 March 1983) is a Senegalese-born Qatari footballer. He currently plays for Al-Khor.

External links
 

Qatari footballers
1983 births
Living people
Al-Khor SC players
Al-Sailiya SC players
Association football goalkeepers
Senegalese emigrants to Qatar
Naturalised citizens of Qatar
Qatari people of Senegalese descent